Jellystone! is an  American animated streaming television comedy series developed by C. H. Greenblatt for HBO Max. The series is produced by Warner Bros. Animation and features reimagined versions of various characters by Hanna-Barbera. It premiered on July 29, 2021.

Jellystone! is the first series to feature many of Hanna-Barbera's trademark characters (such as Yogi Bear and Huckleberry Hound) since 1991's Yo Yogi!, the first production since the closure of the Hanna-Barbera and Ruby-Spears studios, and also the first TV series featuring them without the respective studios' founders William Hanna, Joseph Barbera, Joe Ruby, and Ken Spears, who died in 2001, 2006, and 2020 respectively.

The first season consisted of 21 episodes with most episodes combined in pairs, but was produced as separate 11-minute episodes, including the Halloween episode "Spell Book". The second season was released on March 17, 2022. On March 2, 2022, it was announced that it was renewed for an additional 40 episodes.

Overview
The series is a reimagined take on the legendary Hanna-Barbera brand, focusing on a modernized ensemble of its characters as they live, work, and play together with their everyday lives being turned into madcap hilarity where there is always some form of trouble that they work together to solve.

All of them have specific roles in the community. Huckleberry Hound is the Mayor of Jellystone, Yogi Bear is a surgeon, Doggie Daddy is a lighthouse keeper who is overprotective towards Augie Doggie, Jabberjaw and Loopy De Loop work in Magilla Gorilla's haberdashery called "Magilla's", Top Cat and the Hoagy's Alley cats continue with their scam activities, El Kabong doubles as a teacher and superhero, Shazzan is a ticket seller at Jellystone Theatre and does various vendor jobs, and The Banana Splits are cartoonish criminals.

The episode "Sweet Dreams" claims that Jellystone is nestled between Lake Jellystone and New Bedrock.

Intro gags
During the opening sequence, a gag will occur during the citizens' marching that will knock down some buildings and cause everyone to run. The following gags have occurred:

 The spaceship of Bleep from Josie and the Pussycats in Outer Space crashing into a building (seen in episodes 1, 5, 9, 13b, 14a, 17b and 18a).
 Mildew Wolf tripping over a fire hydrant causing a torrent of water to hit a building as he runs (seen in episodes 2, 6, 10, 14b, 15a, 18b and 19a).
 Grape Ape accidentally knocking down a building (seen in episodes 3, 7, 11b, 12a, 15b, 16a, 19b and 20a).
 Speed Buggy accidentally backing into a building before driving off (seen in episodes 4, 8, 11a, 12b, 13a, 16b, 17a and 20b).

Characters

In contrast with previous Hanna-Barbera media, some of the established male characters are now female in the series for the sake of gender balance; these include Augie Doggie, Jabberjaw, half of Top Cat's gang, Squiddly Diddly and Loopy De Loop.

Production

Jellystone! was developed by C. H. Greenblatt, who also created Chowder and Harvey Beaks for Cartoon Network and Nickelodeon respectively. Production on the series according to Greenblatt began in January 2020, with Unikitty! director Careen Ingle and former Harvey Beaks writer and storyboard artist Hannah Ayoubi. According to Greenblatt's Tumblr, this show has been in early development for at least a year and a half. Greenblatt serves as executive producer alongside Hi Hi Puffy AmiYumi and The Looney Tunes Show creator and Warner Bros. Animation, Cartoon Network Studios, and Hanna-Barbera Studios Europe president Sam Register.

Greenblatt grew up on a lot of Hanna-Barbera content during the 1970s, and gained a deep respect for the brand from there, believing that its expansive array of characters is what really made it work. Whilst working on the series, he and his crew decided to have every single character exist in a single town together, changing some of their core traits to make them more likeable while adapting to modern audiences, instead of recreating their past adventures. They also managed to weave in the action-based characters, such as Jonny Quest and Shazzan, whereas many of the obscure ones, ranging from the Biskitts to Yankee Doodle Pigeon, were reduced to cameos.

In a July interview with Animation Magazine during the series development, Greenblatt stated that they had just outsourced to their animation departments and that the show could debut in 2021.

Jeff Bergman said that he was voicing Yogi Bear amongst others for the series.

The show's HBO Max premiere, July 29, 2021, was announced, as well as the rest of the voice cast.

Unlike Greenblatt's other two shows, which utilized traditional hand-drawn animation, Jellystone! was animated with Adobe Animate by Snipple Animation Studios and Cheeky Little Media. Ben Gruber, who co-created Superjail! for Adult Swim, is the show's story editor.

Greenblatt called the series a "love letter" in an interview with Greg Ehrbar on Jerry Beck's animationscoop.com but "not a nostalgia show", though he had filled the episodes with classic cameos. He did not see the series as a replacement for the original shows and characters, but hoped that the entire Hanna-Barbera library might someday become available easily. Greenblatt also compared the overall vibe of the show to season five of The Simpsons, the point where that series transitioned from a domestic sitcom to a wacky ensemble cast-based show.

Episodes

Series overview

Season 1 (2021)

Season 2 (2022)

Shorts

Kid Stylez for Old People!
A series of shorts in where the kids give makeovers to the adults. The first short was released on the Cartoon Network YouTube channel on September 13, 2021, followed by the second on September 18.

Welcome to Magilla's
A commercial for Magilla Gorilla's haberdashery "Magilla's" was released on September 25, 2021.

Cooking with Winsome Witch
A short in where Winsome Witch teaches people how to cook was released on October 2, 2021.

Kabong It!
A commercial in which El Kabong sells a guitar to deal with life's irritations was released on October 9, 2021.

Health & Safety with Doggie Daddy
A short where Doggie Daddy teaches Augie Doggie how to ride a bike was released on November 27, 2021.

Wait-Tea
A short where Mayor Huckleberry Hound and Mr. Jinks make a batch of Sun-Tea as various crazy events occur around them was released on December 4, 2021.

Release
The series premiered in the United States on July 29, 2021, on HBO Max.

Jellystone premiered in other countries in 2021:

In Canada, the series premiered on October 10 on Teletoon, as well as being shown for American broadcast on Cartoon Network on September 4. The series became available to purchase on Digital storefronts such as iTunes and Vudu the day after. The series premiered in the United Kingdom on Cartoon Network on November 1. In Brazil and Latin America, the series premiered on December 10, on Cartoon Network and HBO Max.

References

External links
 

2020s American animated television series
2021 American television series debuts
American children's animated comedy television series
American flash animated television series
English-language television shows
Yogi Bear television series
Huckleberry Hound television series
Top Cat
Jonny Quest
The Banana Splits
Captain Caveman and the Teen Angels
Television series by Warner Bros. Animation
Television series created by C. H. Greenblatt
Animated television series about mammals
Animated television series reboots
Crossover animated television series
American animated television spin-offs
HBO Max original programming
Cartoon Network original programming